Show Girl is a musical by William Anthony McGuire that ran from Jul 2, 1929  to Oct 5, 1929. The show tells the story of aspiring Broadway showgirl Dixie Dugan (played by Ruby Keeler) as she is pursued by four suitors (played by Eddie Foy, Jr., Joseph Macaulay, Austin Fairman, and Frank McHugh). The music was written by George Gershwin, with lyrics by Ira Gershwin and Gus Kahn.

The character of Dixie Dugan was created by J. P. McEvoy and was first introduced in Liberty before McEvoy published his 1928 novel Show Girl (on which the musical was loosely based).

The Broadway production was produced by Florenz Ziegfeld, directed by McGuire, and choreographed by Bobby Connolly, with ballet sequences—including one set to An American in Paris—by Albertina Rasch. Duke Ellington conducted the orchestra. The show opened on July 2, 1929 at the Ziegfeld Theatre and ran for 111 performances. The cast included Ruby Keeler as Dixie, Jimmy Durante, Eddie Foy, Jr., Frank McHugh, and Nick Lucas.

Keeler's husband, Al Jolson, frequently sat in the audience and serenaded her with the show's closing number, "Liza (All the Clouds'll Roll Away)," from his seat. The song was featured in the 1946 biopic The Jolson Story.

In 1929, Ruby had to withdraw due to illness and Dorothy Stone took over the role.

Warner Brothers filmed this musical as Show Girl (1928), with Alice White as Dixie Dugan; a sequel, Show Girl in Hollywood (1930) was made with White again starring as Dixie.

Cast 
Doris Carson - Raquel

Lew Clayton - Gypsy

Sadie Duff - Mrs. Dugan

Austin Fairman - John Milton

Eddie Foy, Jr. - Denny Kerrigan

Noel Francis - Peggy Ritz

Kathryn Hereford - Bobby

Ruby Keeler - Dixie Dugan

Nick Lucas - Rudy

Joseph Macauley - Alvarez Romano

Frank McHugh - Jimmy Doyle

Howard Morgan - Matt Brown

Barbara Newberry - "Sunshine' and "Virginia Witherby"

Matthew Smith - Captain Robert Adams

Song list
Act One
Happy Birthday
My Sunday Fella
How Could I Forget?
Can Broadway Do Without Me? (Music and lyrics by Jimmy Durante)
Lolita (My Love)
Do What You Do
Spain
One Man
So Are You
I Must Be Home by Twelve O'Clock
Because They All Love You (Lyrics by Thomas Malie, music by J. Little)
Who Will be With You When I Am Far Away? (Music and lyrics By W. H. Farrell)
Black and White
Jimmie, the Well-Dressed Man (Music and lyrics by Jimmy Durante)
Harlem Serenade 
Act Two
An American in Paris
Home Blues
Broadway, My Street (Lyrics by Sidney Skolsky, music by Jimmy Durante)
(So) I Ups to Him (Music and lyrics by Jimmy Durante)
Follow the Minstrel Band
Liza (All the Clouds'll Roll Away)

References

External links
 

1929 musicals
Broadway musicals
Musicals by George and Ira Gershwin
Musicals based on novels